A phlegmon is a localized area of acute inflammation of the soft tissues. It is a descriptive term which may be used for inflammation related to a bacterial infection or non-infectious causes (e.g. pancreatitis). Most commonly, it is used in contradistinction to a "walled-off" pus-filled collection (abscess), although a phlegmon may progress to an abscess if untreated. A phlegmon can localize anywhere in the body. The Latin term phlegmōn is from the Ancient Greek φλέγω (phlégō, "burn").

Signs and symptoms
As with any form of inflammation, phlegmon presents with inflammatory signs dolor (localized pain), calor (increase local tissue temperature), rubor (skin redness/hyperemia), tumor (either clear or non-clear bordered tissue swelling), functio laesa (diminish affected function). There may be systemic signs of infection, such as fever, general fatigue, chills, sweating, headache, loss of appetite.

Cause
Commonly caused by bacterial infection, as in the case of cellulitis or diverticulitis. Non-infectious causes of phlegmon include acute pancreatitis, where inflammation is caused by leaking of pancreatic digestive enzymes into the surrounding tissues.

Factors affecting the development of phlegmon are virulence of bacteria and immunity strength.

Diagnosis
In modern medicine, phlegmon is mostly used descriptively in the fields of surgery/surgical pathology and medical imaging. The ultrasound and CT imaging findings of phlegmon are those of focal tissue edema, with no loculated fluid collection to suggest the formation of an abscess.

Treatment
Since phlegmon describes an area of inflammation, and not a specific disease process, the treatment depends on the cause and severity of the inflammation. Bacterial infections such as cellulitis may be treated by antibiotic therapy, depending on the severity.

See also
 Cellulitis

References

Inflammations
Infectious diseases